Athens is a city in and the county seat of Limestone County, in the U.S. state of Alabama; it is included in the Huntsville-Decatur-Albertville, AL Combined Statistical Area. As of the 2020 census, the population of the city is 25,406

History
Founded in 1818 by John Coffee, Robert Beaty, John D. Carroll, and John Read, Athens is one of the oldest incorporated cities in the state, having been incorporated one year prior to the state's admittance to the Union in 1819.  Limestone County was also created by an act of the Alabama Territorial Legislature in 1818. The town was first called Athenson, but was incorporated as Athens after the ancient city in Greece. The town's first mayor was Samuel Tanner, and the Tanner area, south of Athens, was named on his behalf.

The Athens area was the home of William Wyatt Bibb, the first governor of Alabama, and its second governor, his brother Thomas Bibb, who succeeded him in office when he died in a fall from his horse.

In 1822, local residents purchased  of land and constructed a building to house the Athens Female Academy.  The school became affiliated with the Methodist church in 1842, and was eventually renamed Athens Female College.  After becoming coeducational in 1932, the school changed its name again to Athens College.  After being taken over by the State of Alabama in 1974, the college was converted to a “reverse junior college,” offering the last two years of instruction for graduates of area community colleges.  It is today known as Athens State University.

Many homes in the central part of modern Athens date to the antebellum period, and are part of historic preservation districts.

On May 2, 1862, during the Civil War, Athens was seized by Union forces under the command of Col. John Basil Turchin. After occupying the town on May 2, 1862 Turchin assembled his men and reportedly told them: "I shut my eyes for two hours. I see nothing."  He did, in fact, leave the town to reconnoiter defensive positions, during which time his men ransacked the town.  The incident was controversial, and Lost Cause supporters vilified Turchin.

Athens was the home of Governor George S. Houston, Alabama's first post-Reconstruction Democratic governor, who served from 1874 through 1878.  Houston was noted for reducing the debts incurred to benefit private railroad speculators and others by his Reconstruction Republican predecessors.  During Reconstruction, Athens was the home of the Trinity School, a school founded for the children of former slaves by Mary Fletcher Wells and funded by the American Missionary Association.

Athens was traditionally a cotton and railroad town, but since the local aerospace boom of the 1950s and 1960s, it has increasingly entered the orbit of nearby industry center Huntsville as the area's cotton production has steadily declined.

Athens is the home of Browns Ferry Nuclear Power Plant, a Tennessee Valley Authority installation first operated in 1974, that was once the world's largest nuclear plant.  It provides many jobs to the area and most of the electricity for the Huntsville-Decatur Metro Area.  On March 22, 1975, the Browns Ferry plant became the scene of what was, with the exception of the Three Mile Island accident, the most serious nuclear accident in United States history.  A worker using a candle to check for air leaks started a fire among control wires, causing a temporary threat to operational control of the reactor (see Browns Ferry Nuclear Power Plant article on Unit One Fire).

Geography
Athens is midway between Nashville and Birmingham on Interstate 65. Athens shares a boundary with Huntsville.

Climate
The climate in this area is characterized by hot, humid summers and generally cool winters.  According to the Köppen climate classification system, Athens has a humid subtropical climate, abbreviated "Cfa" on climate maps.

Demographics
Athens first appeared on the 1850 U.S. Census as an incorporated place. It did not appear on the 1860 census, but returned again in 1870 and every census to date.

2000 Census data

As of the census of 2000, there were 18,967 people, 7,742 households, and 5,140 families residing in the city. The racial makeup of the city was 77.72% White, 18.26% Black or African American, 0.40% Native American, 0.71% Asian, 0.02% Pacific Islander, 1.92% from other races, and 0.97% from two or more races. 4.86% of the population were Hispanic or Latino of any race.

There were 7,742 households, of which 30.5% had children under the age of 18 living with them, 50.0% were married couples living together, 13.0% had a female householder with no husband present, and 33.6% were non-families. 31.0% of all households were made up of individuals, and 13.2% had someone living alone who was 65 years of age or older. The average household size was 2.37 and the average family size was 2.97.

In the city, the age distribution of the population showed 23.9% under the age of 18, 9.3% from 18 to 24, 28.4% from 25 to 44, 22.5% from 45 to 64, and 15.8% who were 65 years of age or older. The median age was 38 years. For every 100 females, there were 89.8 males. For every 100 females age 18 and over, there were 85.5 males.

The median income for a household in the city of Athens was $33,980, and the median income for a family was $44,544. Males had a median income of $37,191 versus $22,748 for females. The per capita income for the city was $19,315. About 13.7% of families and 16.3% of the population were below the poverty line, including 21.2% of those under age 45 and 10.8% of those age 65 or over.

2010 census
As of the census of 2010, there were 21,897 people, 9,038 households, and 5,881 families residing in the city. The racial makeup of the city was 73.0% White, 17.5% Black or African American, 0.6% Native American, 0.9% Asian, 0.1% Pacific Islander, 5.9% from other races, and 1.9% from two or more races. 8.8% of the population were Hispanic or Latino of any race.

There were 9,038 households, of which 27.7% had children under the age of 18 living with them, 47.5% were married couples living together, 13.7% had a female householder with no husband present, and 34.9% were non-families. 31.2% of all households were made up of individuals, and 12.4% had someone living alone who was 65 years of age or older. The average household size was 2.36 and the average family size was 2.96.

In the city, the age distribution of the population showed 22.8% under the age of 18, 8.8% from 18 to 24, 26.0% from 25 to 44, 26.2% from 45 to 64, and 16.2% who were 65 years of age or older. The median age was 39.2 years. For every 100 females, there were 91.4 males. For every 100 females age 18 and over, there were 95.7 males.

The median income for a household in the city of Athens was $42,127, and the median income for a family was $54,013. Males had a median income of $43,672 versus $31,601 for females. The per capita income for the city was $26,136. About 15.5% of families and 17.5% of the population were below the poverty line, including 26.4% of those under age 45 and 8.5% of those age 65 or over.

2020 census

As of the 2020 United States census, there were 25,406 people, 9,397 households, and 6,080 families residing in the city.

Athens Precinct/Division (1870-)

Athens, the 1st Beat/Precinct of Limestone County first reported on the 1870 U.S. Census. This included both the town/city of Athens and the surrounding area. It did not report a figure for 1880, but returned in 1890 and every census to date. In 1870, when racial demographics were reported, it had a Black majority in that beat. In 1960, Athens precinct was changed to a census division as part of a general reorganization of counties.

Health care
Athens-Limestone Hospital 101-bed facility

Transportation
 Interstate 65
 U.S. Highway 31
 U.S. Highway 72 
Norfolk Southern Railway
CSX Transportation railroad
 Pryor Field Regional Airport (regional/municipal airport)

Intercity bus service is provided by Greyhound Lines.

Historically, the Louisville and Nashville Railroad ran daily passenger trains, including the Pan-American and an unnamed train, making stops in Athens. This service ended in 1971.

Education

 Athens-Limestone Public Library
 Athens City Schools
 Athens Bible School
 Lindsay Lane Christian Academy K3-12
Athens State University

Media
The News Courier, daily newspaper
WVNN 770 AM
WKAC 1080 AM
WZYP 104.3 FM
WTZT-CD TV channel 11

Notable people 

Woody Abernathy, former professional baseball outfielder
Sheila Andrews, country music singer
Bill Arnsparger defensive coordinator in the National Football League (NFL) for Miami Dolphins teams that won consecutive Super Bowls (1972 and 1973), head coach of the LSU Tigers Football team. 
Keith Askins, NBA  Assistant coach, former player Miami Heat
Don Black, KKK Grand Wizard, Neo Nazi, White Nationalist.
Michael Boley, NFL Outside linebacker New York Giants
Wally Bullington, head football coach for Abilene Christian University from 1968 to 1976
Tom Calvin, former NFL halfback
Dick Coffman, former Major League Baseball player
Slick Coffman, former Major League Baseball player
Billy Davis, former member of the Arizona State Senate
P. O. Davis, early radio pioneer, agricultural editor and Alabama Cooperative Extension Service educator and administrator
Anderson East, R&B singer that is featured on the Fifty Shades Darker soundtrack
Richard Hendrix, Professional Basketball Player
Jake Hess, Grammy Award-winning southern gospel singer
Brittany Howard, singer and guitarist with Alabama Shakes
C. Eric Lincoln, African-American scholar
Patti J. Malone, noted African-American mezzo-soprano singer
Bobby Marlow, former Canadian Football League running back
John Mason Martin, U.S. Representative from 1885 to 1887

Mitch McConnell, U. S. Senator from Kentucky, lived in Athens from 1942 to 1950
Alfred McCullough, American football player
Kevin Miller, radio talk show host
Roger Murrah, songwriter
Andy Nelson, former safety for the Baltimore Colts and New York Giants
Edmund Pettus, lawyer, soldier, and U.S. Senator from 1897 to 1907
Luke Pryor, served as a U.S. Senator in 1880, and as a U.S. Representative from 1883 to 1885
Wayne Redmond, former baseball player for the Detroit Tigers
William N. Richardson, U.S. Representative from 1900 to 1914
Philip Rivers, NFL quarterback, San Diego Chargers
Charles Henry Sykes, editorial cartoonist
Charles Coleman Thach, president of Auburn University from 1902 to 1920
Alice Vassar LaCour, Fisk Jubilee singer and teacher
Lee Vickers, professional football player for the Omaha Nighthawks
James C. Watkins, ceramic artist
Quez Watkins, professional football player
Henry A. White, Alabama educator and state representative; served on the Athens City Council
Pryor Williams, former professional football player

Gallery

References

External links
 
 Athens-Limestone Public Library
 Institute of Southern Jewish Life's History of Athens
  Chamber of Commerce and tourism resource
 Built in America Collection from Library of Congress American Memory Collection contains historic drawings, photographs, and descriptions of homes and buildings in Athens.
 James Croley Smith Collection, The University of Alabama in Huntsville Archives and Special Collections contains sketches of historic buildings in Athens.
 Downtown Different | Athens, Alabama

Populated places established in 1818
Cities in Alabama
Huntsville-Decatur, AL Combined Statistical Area
Cities in Limestone County, Alabama
County seats in Alabama
1818 establishments in Alabama Territory